The R334 road is a regional road in south County Mayo and north County Galway in Ireland. It connects the N84 road at Ballinrobe to the N84 road again at Headford,  to the south (map). It passes to the east of Lough Mask and Lough Corrib.

The government legislation that defines the R334, the Roads Act 1993 (Classification of Regional Roads) Order 2012 (Statutory Instrument 54 of 2012), provides the following official description:

R334: Ballinrobe — Neale, County Mayo — Headford, County Galway

Between its junction with N84 at Bowgate Street at Ballinrobe in the county of Mayo and its junction with N84 at Main Street Headford in the county of Galway via Neale, Lecarrowkilleen, Cross, Dowagh East and Glencorrib in the county of Mayo: and Moyne Bridge at the boundary between the county of Mayo and the county of Galway.

See also
List of roads of County Mayo
National primary road
National secondary road
Regional road
Roads in Ireland

References

Regional roads in the Republic of Ireland
Roads in County Mayo
Roads in County Galway